A Caribbean Mystery is a 1983 American made-for-television mystery film based on the 1964 Agatha Christie novel A Caribbean Mystery and starring Helen Hayes as Miss Marple.

Cast
Helen Hayes as Miss Jane Marple
Barnard Hughes as Mr Rafiel
Jameson Parker as Tim Kendall
Season Hubley as Molly Kendall
Swoosie Kurtz as Ruth Walter
Cassie Yates as Lucky Dyson
Stephen Macht as Greg Dyson
Zakes Mokae as Captain Daventry
Beth Howland as Evelyn Hillingdon
Maurice Evans as Major Geoffrey Palgrave
Lynne Moody as Victoria Johnson
George Innes as Edward Hillingdon
Brock Peters as Dr Graham

Production
Stan Margulies had the rights to eight Christie books. He made a TV movie of Christie's Murder Is Easy. It was a success and the Christie estate liked it, enabling him to get the rights to Caribbean Mystery. He made it around the time of another Christie adaptation, Sparkling Cyanide. Marguiles had to update the stories to the present day because he was unable to do period pieces on a TV movie budget. Because the films were made for American TV, he also insisted on the freedom to cast at least one American actor in the cast.

Marguiles offered Hayes the part of Marple after using her in Murder Is Easy. Hayes said she turned down the role at first because she "adored" the character of Marple "and I didn't want to follow Margaret Rutherford... I can't be that funny."

Filming
The film was shot in Santa Barbara. Hayes said "a lot of things were against us. Like frigid cold and rain every day. We worked indoors while it poured and poured, and when it stopped, we tried to make it look like the tropics. I was wearing light clothes over thermal underwear."

Hayes found the dialogue for Marple difficult. "She has all the summing up, all the exposition. All those lines! I told the producer... 'I can't learn all that stuff.' One of the nice parts about being a star is that the lesser-paid actors have to do the exposition. I haven't done exposition for 50 years."

Reception
The New York Times said the film "has its engaging moments, thanks primarily to an exceptionally good cast."

The film was popular with viewers. Hayes reprised her role as Marple in Murder with Mirrors (1985).

Legacy
The film was seen on TV by writer Richard Levinson who noted its ratings success. He thought of doing a regular mystery show about a Marple-like detective, who was a mystery writer like Agatha Christie. This led to Murder, She Wrote.

References

External links
A Caribbean Mystery at IMDb
A Caribbean Mystery at TCMDB
A Caribbean Mystery at BFI

1983 television films
1983 films
1980s mystery films
American mystery films
Films based on Miss Marple books
Films based on mystery novels
CBS network films
Television shows based on works by Agatha Christie
1980s English-language films
Films directed by Robert Michael Lewis
1980s American films